Vida Bruce is a retired Ghanaian sprinter.

She won a bronze medal in the 4 × 100 metres relay at the 2002 African Championships, and also competed in the 100 metres and the 200 metres at the same event without reaching the final. During the second TrafieCall athletics competition in 2002, Vida went unchallenged in the 100 and 200 metre races and set a new record of 12.09 seconds, beating her past record of 12.14 seconds.

References

Year of birth missing (living people)
Living people
Ghanaian female sprinters
Bruce family of Ghana
21st-century Ghanaian women